John Fowler & Co Engineers of Leathley Road, Hunslet, Leeds, West Yorkshire, England produced traction engines and ploughing implements and equipment, as well as railway equipment.  Fowler also produced the Track Marshall tractor which was a tracked version of the Field Marshall.  British Railways Engineering Department locomotives ED1 to ED7 were built by Fowler

History

John Fowler was an agricultural engineer and inventor who was born in Wiltshire in 1826. He worked on the mechanisation of agriculture and was based in Leeds. He is credited with the invention of steam-driven ploughing engines. He died 4 December 1864, following a hunting accident. After his death, John Fowler & Co., was then continued by Robert Fowler and Robert Eddison. In 1886 the limited company of John Fowler & Co., (Leeds) Ltd., was formed. It merged with Marshall, Sons & Co., Ltd., of Gainsborough in 1947 to form Marshall-Fowler Ltd.

Although not well known for them, Fowler also built a small number (117 has been claimed) of steam wagons. These were vertical-boilered, with an unusual single-crank cross-compound vee-twin engine. They featured a gearbox (but no clutch) to provide  a low drive ratio for climbing steep  hills with heavy loads. At least one was preserved, as part of the Tom Varley collection.

Production of ploughing engines ceased in 1935.The last Fowler steam driven vehicle was a steam roller produced in 1937.

During the Second World War, the Hunslet factory also produced Matilda, Cromwell, and Centaur tanks for the Army. Production finally ceased in early 1974.

Preservation
Around 700 Fowler engines have survived into preservation.

Railway locomotives
Some locations of preserved Fowler railway locomotives include:

Australia
 Bennett Brook Railway, a tourist railway in Perth, Western Australia
 Leeds Fowler 11277: restored in Bundaberg, Australia
 Leeds Fowler, 0-6-0T, "Faugh-a Ballagh", preserved at Port Douglas, Australia.

Brazil
 Railway Museum in Jundiaí, SP (Brazil). Builder plates #1531 from 1870, she's a 4-4-0 for  gauge. Built for Companhia Paulista de Estradas de Ferro where she spent all of her active life and as CP's first locomotive she was numbered #1.

Germany
 Open Air Museum "Freilichtmuseum am Kiekeberg", near Hamburg, Germany

New Zealand
Canterbury Steam Preservation Society, Christchurch, New Zealand
Silver Stream Railway, Wellington, New Zealand
Tokomaru Steam Museum, Tokomaru, New Zealand

India
National Railway Museum, Delhi, India

Pakistan
 Changa Manga Forest Railway, Pakistan

United Kingdom
 Amberley Museum Railway
 Bredgar & Wormshill Light Railway
 East Kent Railway (heritage)
 Middleton Railway – Two Fowler locomotives
 Midland Railway Butterley
 Pontypool and Blaenavon Railway
 Ribble Steam Railway & Museum - diesel shunter no. 4160001
 Statfold Barn Railway
 Vale of Rheidol Railway Museum Collection - Not currently on public display
Swanage Railway- Diesel Shunter 'May'- Under restoration
Yorkshire Wolds Railway - diesel 0-6-0 Shunter no. 4240017 Patricia - Under restoration

Traction engines

The Iron Maiden, a Fowler & Co.-built Showman's engine which was featured in the film, The Iron Maiden, is exhibited as part of the Scarborough Fair Collection of Fairground organs and machinery at events such as the Great Dorset Steam Fair.
The Melbourne Steam Traction Engine Club of Melbourne, Victoria, Australia, a volunteer organisation dealing with the preservation of Australia's mechanical heritage, has a number of Fowler Traction Engines and Steam Rollers in preservation, some privately owned by members, and some owned by the club. Most are in restored, operating condition and are demonstrated to the public regularly. Club engines include one of a pair of Z7 ploughing engines.

References

External links

 
 List of Fowler-built steam locomotives
 Fowler traction engines
 Fowler diesel locomotive (model)
 Fowler Traction Engine list
 Leeds Fowler 11277 preserved in Bundaberg Australia
 Video clip of Leeds Fowler 11277 preserved in Bundaberg Australia
 The records of the company, to 1974, are held at Reading University - Museum of English Rural Life - John Fowler and Co (Leeds) Ltd (TR FOW/AC - TR FOW/AD)
 

Agricultural machinery manufacturers of the United Kingdom
Fowler
Defunct manufacturing companies of the United Kingdom
Former defence companies of the United Kingdom
Fowler, John
Manufacturing companies based in Leeds
Defunct companies based in Leeds